Timeline of the Kosovo War. Abbreviations:
Combatants
KLA—Kosovo Liberation Army
FARK—Armed Forces of the Republic of Kosovo
VJ—Yugoslav Army
NATO—North Atlantic Treaty Organization
Peace-keeping forces
KFOR—Kosovo Force (NATO)
Organizations
ICTY—International Criminal Tribunal for the former Yugoslavia (UN)
IICK—Independent International Commission on Kosovo
KDOM—Kosovo Diplomatic Observer Mission

Background

1981

1996

1998

28 February: Firefight in Likošane. 4 Yugoslav policemen killed in an ambush by KLA.
28 February: Serbian police killed 14 Albanians of the Ahmeti family.
5 March: 4 Yugoslav policemen killed in an ambush by KLA in Prekaz.
5–7 March: Attack on Prekaz. Yugoslav victory. 28 militants and 30 civilians killed by VJ.
7-10 March: Battle of Llapushnik KLA victory.
24 March: First Battle of Glodjane KLA victory.
23 April: Albanian–Yugoslav border clashes. Yugoslav victory. 18 militants killed by VJ.
25 May: 3 Yugoslav policemen killed in an ambush by KLA near Ljubenić.
7 May: 2 elderly Albanians found dead, 400 metres from the monastery.
8 May: Serbian Special Police attack a van in Dečan carrying Serb and Albanian power plant workers, killing 1 and injuring 4.
25 May and 1 April: Ljubenić massacres.
22 June–1 July: Battle of Belaćevac Mine. Yugoslav victory.
18 July: Albanian–Yugoslav border clashes. Yugoslav victory.
25–26 July: KLA abandonment of the Lapušnik prison camp. 23 of 35 inmates killed by KLA.
5 July: 2 Yugoslav policemen killed in an ambush by KLA near Lođa.
6 July–17 July: First Battle of Lođa. KLA victory.
17–20 July Battle of Orahovac. Yugoslav victory.
28 July–17 August: Battle of Junik. Yugoslav victory.
9 August: Opljaz clashes. KLA victory, 20 Yugoslav soldiers killed by the KLA.
1-30 August: 17 Yugoslav policemen killed in attacks by KLA in the Drenica valley.
10 August–17 August: Second Battle of Lođa. Yugoslav victory.
11–12 August: Second Battle of Glodjane Yugoslav victory.
9 September: Lake Radonjić massacre.
15 September: Đeravica clashes. KLA victory, 40 Yugoslav soldiers killed.
30 September: Ambush near Koshare. KLA victory.
25 September: 5 Yugoslav policemen killed in an ambush by KLA near Likovac.
26 and 29 September: Gornje Obrinje massacre.
3 December: Albanian–Yugoslav border clash. Yugoslav victory.
14 December: Albanian–Yugoslav border clashes. Yugoslav victory.
14 December: Panda Bar massacre.
23–27 December: Battle of Podujevo. Yugoslav victory.

1999

 8 and 10 January: 4 Yugoslav policemen killed by KLA near Uroševac.
Račak massacre.
 NATO bombing of Yugoslavia, Operation Allied Force.
 F-117A shoot-down.
 Bombing of Novi Sad.
 Bela Crkva massacre.
 Velika Kruša massacre.
 Suva Reka massacre.
 Izbica massacre.
 Drenica massacres.
13 April: Albania–Yugoslav border incident. Status quo ante bellum. Albanian Army retakes control.
21 April: 6 Yugoslav policemen killed in an ambush by KLA near Meja.
Meja massacre.
April: 2 Yugoslav policemen killed in an ambush by KLA near Vučitrn.
 Vučitrn massacre.
 Battle of Košare. KLA forces captured the border outpost of Košare between FR Yugoslavia and Albania, but were unable to make further advances.
19-20 May: 14 Yugoslav special forces killed in an ambush by KLA near Junik.
26 May: 2 Yugoslav policemen killed in an ambush by KLA in Tasus
26 May: Tasus massacre. Serbian police kills 27 Albanian civilians.
 Grdelica train bombing.
 NATO bombing of Albanian refugees near Gjakova.
 NATO bombing of the Radio Television of Serbia headquarters.
 NATO bombing of Belgrade streets.
 Lužane bus bombing.
 Cluster bombing of Niš.
 United States bombing of the Chinese embassy in Belgrade.
 Koriša bombing.
 Ćuška massacre.
 Battle of Pashtrik. KLA forces capture Mount Paštrik, but are unable to make further advances

References

Further reading

Kosovo War
Kosovo War
Kosovo history-related lists
Serbian military-related lists
Serbian history timelines